Robert Bassett Ullyett (5 April 1936 – 19 October 2004) was a Rhodesian first-class cricketer who played for Rhodesia in the Currie Cup.

The all-rounder was one of six 'South African Cricket Annual Cricketers of the Year' in 1964 on the back of a strong Currie Cup season in which he scored 449 runs at 49.88. It was the first time that he had played as a specialist batsman and he was Rhodesia's leading run-getter that season. Despite having success with the ball in previous years, he didn't add to his 46 first-class wickets from that season until his retirement, only bowling the occasional over. He had twice taken seven wickets in an innings back in 1958, with a best of 7/42 against North Eastern Transvaal at Benoni.

Ullyett represented Rhodesia in field hockey at the 1964 Summer Olympics held in Tokyo and scored a goal in their 4–1 loss to Great Britain. His son Kevin Ullyett is a professional tennis player who won Grand Slam doubles titles at the US and Australian Opens.

In 2000 Ullyett served at the Match Referee in two List A matches at an ICC Emerging Nations Tournament which Zimbabwe hosted.

References

External links
 

1936 births
2004 deaths
Cricketers from Harare
Alumni of Chaplin High School
Zimbabwean people of British descent
White Rhodesian people
Rhodesia cricketers
Rhodesian male field hockey players
Olympic field hockey players of Rhodesia
Field hockey players at the 1964 Summer Olympics
Rhodesian expatriates in South Africa
Zimbabwean expatriates in South Africa